The science fiction writer Robert A. Heinlein (1907–1988) was productive during a writing career that spanned the last 49 years of his life; the Robert A. Heinlein bibliography includes 32 novels, 59 short stories and 16 collections published during his life. Four films, two TV series, several episodes of a radio series, at least two songs ('Hijack' by Jefferson Starship and 'Cool Green Hills of Earth' on the 1970 album Ready to Ride and as the b-side of a single by Southwind) and a board game derive more or less directly from his work. He wrote a screenplay for one of the films. Heinlein edited an anthology of other writers' science fiction short stories.

Three non-fiction books and two poems have been published posthumously. One novel has been published posthumously and another, an unusual collaboration, was published in 2006.   Four collections have been published posthumously.

Known pseudonyms include Anson MacDonald (7 times), Lyle Monroe (7), John Riverside (1), Caleb Saunders (1), and Simon York (1).  All the works originally attributed to MacDonald, Saunders, Riverside and York, and many of the works originally attributed to Lyle Monroe, were later reissued in various Heinlein collections and attributed to Heinlein.

Novels 

Novels marked with an asterisk * are part of Scribner's "juvenile" series.

Early Heinlein novels 

Rocket Ship Galileo, 1947 *
Beyond This Horizon, 1948 (initially serialized in 1942, and at that time credited to Anson MacDonald)
Space Cadet, 1948 *
Red Planet, 1949 *
Sixth Column, 1949 (initially serialized in 1941, and at that time credited to Anson MacDonald) (a.k.a. The Day After Tomorrow)
Farmer in the Sky, 1950 (initially serialized in a condensed version in Boys' Life magazine as "Satellite Scout") (Retro Hugo Award, 1951) *
Between Planets, 1951 *
The Puppet Masters, 1951 (re-published posthumously with excisions restored, 1990)
The Rolling Stones, 1952 (a.k.a. Space Family Stone) *
Starman Jones, 1953 *
The Star Beast, 1954 *
Tunnel in the Sky, 1955 *
Double Star, 1956—Hugo Award, 1956
Time for the Stars, 1956 *
Citizen of the Galaxy, 1957 *
The Door into Summer, 1957
Have Space Suit—Will Travel, 1958—Hugo Award nominee, 1959 *
Methuselah's Children, 1958 (originally a serialized novella in 1941)
Starship Troopers, 1959—Hugo Award, 1960

Middle Heinlein novels 

Stranger in a Strange Land, 1961—Hugo Award, 1962 (reprinted at the original greater length in 1991)
Podkayne of Mars, 1963
Orphans of the Sky, 1963 (fix-up novel comprising the novellas "Universe" and "Common Sense", both originally published in 1941)
Glory Road, 1963—Hugo Award nominee, 1964
Farnham's Freehold, 1964
The Moon Is a Harsh Mistress, 1966—Hugo Award, 1967
I Will Fear No Evil, 1970
Time Enough for Love, 1973—Nebula Award nominated, 1973; Hugo and Locus SF Awards nominated, 1974

Late Heinlein novels 

The Number of the Beast, 1980
Friday, 1982—Hugo, Nebula, and Locus SF Awards nominee, 1983
Job: A Comedy of Justice, 1984—Nebula Award nominee, 1984; Locus Fantasy Award winner, Hugo Award nominee, 1985
The Cat Who Walks Through Walls, 1985
To Sail Beyond the Sunset, 1987

Heinlein works published posthumously
 For Us, the Living: A Comedy of Customs (written in 1938, published posthumously in 2003)
 Variable Star (posthumously with Spider Robinson; Heinlein's eight page outline written in 1955; Robinson's full novel from the outline appeared in 2006)
 The Pursuit of the Pankera, published posthumously in 2020, an alternate version of The Number of the Beast

Short fiction

"Future History" short fiction 

 "Life-Line", 1939
 "Misfit", 1939
 "Let There Be Light", 1940 (as Lyle Monroe)
 "The Roads Must Roll", 1940
 "Requiem", 1940
 "If This Goes On—", 1940, first novel
 "Coventry", 1940
 "Blowups Happen", 1940
 "Universe", 1941
 "—We Also Walk Dogs", 1941 (as Anson MacDonald)
 "Common Sense", 1941
 "Methuselah's Children", 1941 (lengthened and published as a novel, 1958)
 "Logic of Empire", 1941
 "Space Jockey", 1947
 "It's Great to Be Back!", 1947
 "The Green Hills of Earth", 1947
 "Ordeal in Space", 1948
 "The Long Watch", 1948
 "Gentlemen, Be Seated!", 1948
 "The Black Pits of Luna", 1948
 "Delilah and the Space Rigger", 1949
 "The Man Who Sold the Moon", 1950 (Retro Hugo Award)
 "The Menace From Earth", 1957
 "Searchlight", 1962

Other short speculative fiction 
All the works initially attributed to Anson MacDonald, Caleb Saunders, John Riverside and Simon York, and many of the works attributed to Lyle Monroe, were later reissued in various Heinlein collections and attributed to Heinlein.

At Heinlein's insistence, the three Lyle Monroe stories marked with the symbol '§' were never reissued in a Heinlein anthology during his lifetime.

 "Magic, Inc.", 1940 (a.k.a. "The Devil Makes the Law")
 "Solution Unsatisfactory", 1940 (as Anson MacDonald)
 "Let There Be Light", 1940 (as Lyle Monroe)
 "Successful Operation" 1940 (a.k.a. "Heil!") (as Lyle Monroe)
 "They", 1941
 "—And He Built a Crooked House—", 1941
 "By His Bootstraps", 1941 (as Anson MacDonald)
 "Lost Legacy", 1941 (a.k.a. "Lost Legion") (as Lyle Monroe)
 "Elsewhen", 1941 (a.k.a. "Elsewhere") (as Caleb Saunders)
 "Beyond Doubt", 1941 (as Lyle Monroe with Elma Wentz) §
 "The Unpleasant Profession of Jonathan Hoag", 1942 (as John Riverside)
 "Waldo", 1942 (as Anson MacDonald)
 "My Object All Sublime", 1942 (as Lyle Monroe) §
 "Goldfish Bowl", 1942 (as Anson MacDonald)
 "Pied Piper", 1942 (as Lyle Monroe) §
 "Free Men", 1946 (published 1966)

 "Jerry Was a Man", 1947
 "Columbus Was a Dope", 1947 (as Lyle Monroe)
 "On the Slopes of Vesuvius", 1947
 "Our Fair City", 1948
 "Gulf", 1949
 "Nothing Ever Happens on the Moon", 1949
 "Destination Moon", 1950
 "The Year of the Jackpot", 1952
 "Project Nightmare", 1953
 "Sky Lift", 1953
 "A Tenderfoot in Space", 1956 (serialized 1958)
 "The Man Who Traveled in Elephants", 1957 (a.k.a. "The Elephant Circuit")
 "—All You Zombies—", 1959

Other short fiction 

 "A Bathroom of Her Own", 1946
 "Dance Session", 1946 (love poem)
 "The Witch's Daughters", 1946 (poem)
 "Water Is for Washing", 1947
 "They Do It with Mirrors", 1947 (as Simon York)
"No Bands Playing, No Flags Flying", written 1947, published 1973
 "Poor Daddy", 1949
 "Cliff and the Calories", 1950
 "The Bulletin Board", 1951

Collections 

 The Man Who Sold the Moon, 1950
 Waldo & Magic, Inc., 1950
 The Green Hills of Earth, 1951
 Assignment in Eternity, 1953
 Revolt in 2100, 1953 ("If this goes on--", "Coventry", and "Misfit")
 The Robert Heinlein Omnibus, 1958
 The Menace from Earth, 1959
 The Unpleasant Profession of Jonathan Hoag, 1959 (a.k.a. 6 X H)
 Three by Heinlein, 1965 (The Puppet Masters, "Waldo", "Magic, Inc.")
 A Robert Heinlein Omnibus, 1966 
 The Worlds of Robert A. Heinlein, 1966
 The Past Through Tomorrow, 1967 (almost-complete Future History collection, missing "Let There Be Light", "Universe", and "Common Sense")
 The Best of Robert A. Heinlein, 1973
 Expanded Universe, 1980
 A Heinlein Trio, 1980 (omnibus of The Puppet Masters, Double Star, and The Door Into Summer)
 The Fantasies of Robert A. Heinlein, 1999 (omnibus of Waldo & Magic, Inc. and The Unpleasant Profession of Jonathan Hoag)
 Infinite Possibilities, 2003 (omnibus of Tunnel in the Sky, Time for the Stars, and Citizen of the Galaxy)
 To the Stars, 2004 (omnibus of Between Planets, The Rolling Stones, Starman Jones, and The Star Beast)
 Off the Main Sequence, 2005 (short stories including three never before collected)
 Four Frontiers, 2005 (omnibus of Rocket Ship Galileo, Space Cadet, Red Planet, and Farmer in the Sky)
 Outward Bound, 2006 (omnibus of Have Space Suit—Will Travel, Starship Troopers, Podkayne of Mars)
 Project Moonbase and Others, 2008 (collection of screenplays)

Complete works 

 The Virginia Edition,  a 46-volume hardcover collection of all of Robert Heinlein's stories, novels, and nonfiction writing, plus a selection of his personal correspondence, was announced by Meisha Merlin Publishing in April 2005; the Robert A. and Virginia Heinlein Prize Trust (which now owns the Heinlein copyrights) instigated the project. Meisha Merlin went out of business in May 2007 after producing six volumes: I Will Fear No Evil, Time Enough for Love, Starship Troopers, For Us, the Living, The Door into Summer, and Double Star.
 The Heinlein Prize Trust then decided to publish the edition itself, having formed the Virginia Edition Publishing Co. for this purpose. As was true for the Meisha Merlin effort, individual volumes are not offered; subscribers must purchase the entire 46-volume set. The final five volumes (including two volumes of screenwriting, both produced and unproduced) were shipped to subscribers in June 2012.
 In July 2007, the Heinlein Prize Trust opened the online Heinlein Archives, which allows people to purchase and download items from the Heinlein Archive previously stored at the University of California-Santa Cruz. The Trust makes grants available to those using the archives for scholarly purposes.

Foreword 

 Tomorrow, the Stars, 1952, anthology of stories by 14 authors selected by Frederik Pohl and Judith Merril, foreword by Heinlein who got his name on the cover.

Nonfiction 
 "Where To?", Galaxy, 1952.
 Two articles for Encyclopædia Britannica on Paul Dirac and antimatter, and on blood chemistry.
 Grumbles from the Grave, 1989 (posthumously)
 Take Back Your Government: A Practical Handbook for the Private Citizen, 1992 (Originally published as How to Be a Politician)
 Tramp Royale, 1992
 "Spinoff", an article based on Heinlein's testimony to the US Congress about the commercialization of inventions created for NASA and the American space program, published in Omni magazine, 1980; reprinted in Expanded Universe.

Filmography 
 Destination Moon (story (from the book Rocket Ship Galileo), screenplay, technical advisor), 1950, IMDb (Retro Hugo Award, 1951)
 Out There, TV series, 1951 (from three short stories: "The Green Hills of Earth", "Misfit", and "Ordeal in Space")
 Project Moonbase, 1953, IMDb
 The Brain Eaters, 1959 (from the book The Puppet Masters, uncredited, sued by Heinlein), IMDb
  Uchu no Senshi (Japanese animated video series based on Starship Troopers), 1988
 Red Planet, TV miniseries (from the book), 1994, IMDb
 The Puppet Masters, film (from the book), 1994, IMDb
 Starship Troopers, film (very loosely and partially based on the book), 1997, IMDb
 Roughnecks: The Starship Troopers Chronicles, TV series based on the 1997 movie, 1999, IMDb
 Masters of Science Fiction, TV miniseries (from the short story "Jerry Was a Man"), 2007
 Starship Troopers: Invasion, film (very loosely based on the book "Starship Troopers"), 2012, IMDb
 Predestination, film (from the short story —All You Zombies—), 2014, IMDb
 The Door Into Summer (Japanese title: 夏への扉 キミのいる未来へ Natsu e no Tobira: Kimi no Iru Mirai e), film (from the book), 2021, IMDb

Spinoffs 
 The Notebooks of Lazarus Long, illuminated by D. F. Vassallo, 1978
 New Destinies, Vol. VI/Winter 1988—Robert A. Heinlein Memorial Issue, 1988
 Fate's Trick by Matt Costello, 1988, a "game book" inspired by Glory Road
 Requiem: New Collected Works by Robert A. Heinlein and Tributes to the Grand Master, 1992
 Two different Starship Troopers board games were published by Avalon Hill in 1976 and 1997
 The video game Starship Troopers: Terran Ascendancy was published by Blue Tongue Entertainment in 2000
 Dimension X, science fiction radio programs in 1950–1951.  Among other writers, episodes were based on Heinlein's Destination Moon (film) (ep. 12), The Green Hills of Earth (ep. 10), Requiem, The Roads Must Roll, and Universe.
 X Minus One, radio series in 1955–1958: Universe
 Language arts materials for teachers based on Heinlein's works, in support of World Space Week, 2005.

See also 

 List of Robert A. Heinlein characters

Citations

External links 
 The Heinlein Society and their FAQ.
 Damon Knight Memorial Grand Master Award
 Robert A. Heinlein, Grandmaster of Science Fiction
 
 Good bibliography, essays, news, links, etc.
 
 Illustrated list of Heinlein fiction
 Heinlein Concordance
 Heinlein Archives 
 Virginia Edition Blog
 Robert A. Heinlein at Worlds Without End

Bibliographies by writer
Bibliographies of American writers
Robert A. Heinlein
Science fiction bibliographies